Saiful is a given name. Notable people with the name include:

Saiful Alom, Bengali politician
Saiful Apek (born 1969), Malaysian actor and comedian
Saiful Azam (born 1941), Pakistan Air Force officer
Saiful Haq, Bangladeshi architect, educator, architectural theorist and activist
Saiful Hoque, Bangladeshi diplomat, Ambassador of Bangladesh to Russia
Saiful Islam (disambiguation), several people
Mohd Saiful Nizam Miswan (born 1981), Malaysian footballer
Saiful Rijal, the eighth sultan of Brunei
Mohd Saiful Rusly (born 1978), Malaysian footballer
Saiful Amar Sudar, Malaysian footballer
Saiful Bukhari Azlan, Malaysian political worker and politician
Saiful Bari Titu, football coach and player from Bangladesh
Saiful (footballer), Indonesian footballer

See also
Sultan Saiful Rijal Technical College (MTSSR), a technical college in Bandar Seri Begawan, Brunei
Prince Saiful Malook and Badri Jamala, classic fable from the Hazara region of Pakistan
Lake Saiful Muluk, an alpine lake at the northern end of the Kaghan Valley near the town of Naran
Saiful Muluk National Park in the Kaghan Valley in Mansehra District of Khyber-Pakhtunkhwa, in northern Pakistan
Saifu (c.577), king of Axum
Saifullah (disambiguation)